Jacob van Schalkwyk (born 20 September 1979) is a South African visual artist and writer.

Biography
Van Schalkwyk grew up in Pretoria, South Africa before moving to New York City in 0000 to attend the Pratt Institute of Art and Design, where he majored in drawing. While obtaining his Bachelor of Fine Arts degree he was the recipient of the Pratt Circle Award for Academic Achievement in 2003 and editor of The Prattler. Van Schalkwyk returned to South Africa in 2008 and now lives in Sea Point, Cape Town.

Art
Van Schalkwyk's work is rooted in abstraction, incorporating themes and ideas from mathematics as compositional tools. He is concerned with material and technique, born from a love of paper. Van Schalkwyk uses lithographic ink as a medium for painting and drawing. His works on paper conflate the distinction between printmaking, drawing, painting and low-relief sculpture.

Van Schalkwyk's work was represented by GALLERY AOP in Johannesburg from 2011 - 2016. A limited edition of 100 monographs Drawings 2011-2013 was published by the gallery. In 2016, David Krut Projects took over the representation of his work. Van Schalkwyk's practise spans drawing, painting, printmaking, film and video, sculpture and installation.

Exhibitions
2017 DOLCEFARNIENTE, David Krut Projects, Johannesburg and Cape Town
2017 Atmosphere, David Krut Projects, New York City
2016 SUNSETS, David Krut Projects, Cape Town
2016 Open Dialog Box, Cape Town
2015 Drawing a Group Show, GUS Gallery, Stellenbosch
2011 2015 GALLERY AOP, FNB Joburg Art Fair, Johannesburg
2014, 2015 GALLERY AOP, Cape Town Art Fair, Cape Town
2014, 2015 Edinburgh International Fashion Festival, Scotland
2014 Topoi, Tropi, Apotropos, GALLERY AOP, Johannesburg
2013 Constraints, GALLERY AOP, Johannesburg
2013 Back to The Future, SMAC Gallery, Stellenbosch
2013 6+1...14+1; 1st, 2nd, Blank Projects, Cape Town
2012 FUN AND GAMES..., GALLERY AOP, Johannesburg
2012 When Form Becomes Attitude, Blank Projects, Cape Town
2012 Blank Projects, SUPERMARKET Art Fair, Stockholm, Sweden
2011 Bait al-Hikma, GALLERY AOP, Johannesburg
2010 Drawing Links, GALLERY AOP, Johannesburg
2002 SAIDA DE EMÉRGENCIA, Graduate exhibition, Pratt Institute, New York

Collections
Jacob van Schalkwyk has been included in private and corporate collections in South Africa, the United States and Europe.
South African Reserve Bank Collection 
Telkom SA Collection
Landstinget Dalarna Collection, Sweden
Spier Art Collection
Nando’s Contemporary African Art Collection

Writing
The Alibi Club, his debut novel detailing his time in Fort Greene, Brooklyn was published by Umuzi, a division of Penguin-Random House in 2014 in both Afrikaans and English. It was nominated for the Sunday Times Literary Award, the UJ Fiction Prize and SATI Award for Outstanding Translation.

Book Reviews
The Alibi Club by Karin Schimke.
Hard-earned Swagger and Confidence at the Launch of Jaco van Schalkwyk’s The Alibi Club by Books Live Sunday Times.

Music
After graduating from the Pratt Institute of Art and Design in 0000, Van Schalkwyk collaborated with Carl Hancock Rux on his third studio album Good Bread Alley, and opera-oratorio MYCENAEAN before returning to South Africa. In South Africa he formed the Afrikaans art-punk duo Jaco+Z-dog with artist Zander Blom from 2009-2011. He performed as a guest vocalist on The Buckfever Underground's 2012 album Verkeerdevlei.

Film
Van Schalkwyk participated in a number of short films by artist Michael Macgarry.

Poetry
Van Schalkwyk is the great-grandson of A.G. Visser. Both he and Visser have had poetry published in Ons Kleintji.

References

External links
Jacob van Schalkwyk, artsy.net

1979 births
Living people
People from Fort Greene, Brooklyn
Pratt Institute alumni
South African male artists
South African male writers